The First Pain to Linger is a book with a maxi-CD by the darkwave band Black Tape for a Blue Girl. It was released in 1996 by Projekt Records. It is also the title of a novella by Sam Rosenthal that accompanies the album. The songs are different mixes and compilation tracks recorded between 1990 and 1995, in conjunction with the This Lush Garden Within and A Chaos of Desire albums.

Track listing
 "Forbidden"
 "The Glass Is Shattered"
 "Pandora's Dream"
 "Overwhelmed, Beneath Me"
 "I No Longer Remember the Feelings"
 "A Good Omen"
 [Untitled]

Sources

Black Tape for a Blue Girl albums
1996 debut EPs
Projekt Records albums